Events from the year 1413 in France.

Incumbents
 Monarch – Charles VI

Events
 21 March - Henry V succeeded his father as King of England and revives his family's claim to the French throne. 
 Spring - As part of the Cabochien revolt, John the Fearless leads an uprising in Paris against the Armagnacs.
 Unknown - The role of Grand Huntsman of France is created.

Births
 Philippe de Culant, soldier (died 1454)

Deaths

References

1410s in France